Boško Baškot (Serbian Cyrillic: Бошко Башкот; 11 June 1922 – 19 March 2013) was a notable Yugoslav Partisan and Bosnian politician, Minister of the Interior of SR Bosnia and Herzegovina and sports administrator.

References

1921 births
2013 deaths
People from Prijedor
Serbs of Bosnia and Herzegovina
Yugoslav politicians
Bosnia and Herzegovina politicians
FK Sarajevo presidents of the assembly